God's Clay may refer to:

 God's Clay (novel), a 1913 novel by Alice and Claude Askew
 God's Clay (1919 film), a British film directed by Arthur Rooke
 God's Clay (1928 film), a British film directed by Graham Cutts